John Henry Williams (May 1, 1918 - May 4, 1986), nicknamed "Nature Boy", was an American Negro league pitcher who played in the 1940s.

A native of Shreveport, Louisiana, Williams made his Negro leagues debut in 1943 with the Birmingham Black Barons. He joined the Cincinnati/Indianapolis Clowns in 1944 played for Indianapolis through 1948. He was named to the East–West All-Star Game in 1946 and 1947. Williams went on to play minor league baseball in the 1950s for the Elmira Pioneers and Hornell Dodgers.

References

External links
 and Seamheads

1918 births
1986 deaths
Birmingham Black Barons players
Cincinnati Clowns players
Indianapolis Clowns players
Baseball pitchers
Baseball players from Shreveport, Louisiana